This article shows all the songs that has been number one on the official Danish singles chart, Tracklisten, in 2011, as compiled by Nielsen Music Control in association with the Danish branch of the International Federation of the Phonographic Industry (IFPI).

Chart history

See also 
 2011 in music

References 

Number-one hits
Denmark
2011